Kobylinek  is a village in the administrative district of Gmina Prostki, within Ełk County, Warmian-Masurian Voivodeship, in northern Poland.

The village has a population of 90.

References

Kobylinek